Afsar Bahini (also known as Afsar Battalion) was a sub group within Mukti Bahini during the Bangladesh Liberation War. Major Afsaruddin Ahmed organized independence fighters in Mymensingh to form this battalion. This battalion collected arms from the Pakistan army and developed liberated area in the region. Major Afsaruddin Ahmed was the Chief of Command of this group.

References

Mukti Bahini
Bangladesh Liberation War
History of Bangladesh (1971–present)